Gavdari-ye Mohammad Qoli Rusta (also Romanized as Gāvdārī-ye Moḩammad Qolī Rūstā) is a village in Sefidar Rural District, Khafr District, Jahrom County, Fars Province, Iran. At the 2006 census, its population was 21, in 4 families.

References 

Populated places in Jahrom County